The 1959 Kent State Golden Flashes football team was an American football team that represented Kent State University in the Mid-American Conference (MAC) during the 1959 NCAA University Division football season. In their 14th season under head coach Trevor J. Rees, the Golden Flashes compiled a 5–3 record (3–3 against MAC opponents), finished in fourth place in the MAC, and outscored all opponents by a combined total of 144 to 124.

The team's statistical leaders included John Martin with 391 rushing yards, Dick Mostardo with 164 passing yards, and Lou Perry with 141 receiving yards.

Schedule

References

Kent State
Kent State Golden Flashes football seasons
Kent State Golden Flashes football